Hellinsia orellanai is a moth of the family Pterophoridae that is endemic to Ecuador.

The forewings are pale yellow and the markings are brown. The hindwings and fringes are very pale yellow-brown.

Etymology
The species is named after Francisco de Orellana, conquistador and lieutenant of Gonzalo Pizarro.

References

Moths described in 2011
Endemic fauna of Ecuador
orellanai
Moths of South America